"Out of My Head and Back in My Bed" is a 1977 single written by Peggy Forman and recorded by Loretta Lynn. It was Lynn's twelfth-and-last number one on the U.S. country music chart as a solo artist.  The single stayed at number one for two weeks and spent a total of eleven weeks on the chart.

Chart performance

References
 

Loretta Lynn songs
1977 singles
MCA Records singles
1977 songs